Clement Francis "Clem" Neacy  (July 18, 1898 – March 19, 1968) was an American football end and tackle in the National Football League. He played professionally for the Milwaukee Badgers, Duluth Eskimos, Chicago Bears, and the Chicago Cardinals.

Early life
Neacy was born in Milwaukee, Wisconsin. He played college football at Colgate University and the University of Wisconsin–Milwaukee. He graduated from Colgate University in 1924,

Professional career
In 1924, he began playing in the NFL with the Milwaukee Badgers. He played five seasons in the NFL, playing his last game with the Milwaukee Badgers in 1928.

In 1930, Neacy played for the Milwaukee Nighthawks, an American football team trying to become part of the NFL franchise. In 1931, the team ended and Neacy retired from professional football.

Life after the NFL
Neacy graduated from Rush Medical College in 1930, and became a surgeon with the Veterans Administration. He worked at the National Home for Disabled Volunteer Soldiers in Milwaukee, the Veterans Administration Hospital in Togus and the Wood Veterans Hospital in Milwaukee.

Neacy died in Palos Verdes Estates, California on March 19, 1968, and is interred at the Wood National Cemetery in Milwaukee.

See also
List of Chicago Bears players

References

1898 births
1968 deaths
American football ends
American football tackles
Chicago Bears players
Chicago Cardinals players
Duluth Eskimos players
Colgate Raiders football players
Milwaukee Badgers players
Milwaukee Panthers football players
Rush Medical College alumni
Players of American football from Milwaukee
Physicians from Wisconsin
People from Palos Verdes Estates, California
South Division High School alumni